Adrianus ("Adri" or "Adrie") Voorting (15 February 1931 – 1 August 1961) was a road bicycle and track cyclist from the Netherlands, who represented his native country at the 1952 Summer Olympics in Helsinki, Finland. There he was eliminated in the quarterfinals of the men's 4,000 m team pursuit, alongside Jan Plantaz, Daan de Groot and Jules Maenen. In the individual road race Voorting ended up in 49th place.

He died a few days after a traffic accident, aged 30. His elder brother Gerrit was also an Olympic cyclist.

See also
 List of Dutch Olympic cyclists

References

External links
 
 

1931 births
1961 deaths
Dutch track cyclists
Dutch male cyclists
Cyclists at the 1952 Summer Olympics
Olympic cyclists of the Netherlands
Sportspeople from Haarlem
Cyclists from North Holland
20th-century Dutch people